Abraxas picaria is a species of moth belonging to the family Geometridae. It was described by Frederic Moore in 1868. It is known from Bengal.

References

Abraxini
Moths of Asia
Moths described in 1868